Ōishi, Oishi or Ooishi is a Japanese surname. Notable people with the surname include:

 , Japanese baseball player
 , Japanese politician of the Democratic Party of Japan
 , Japanese wrestler, currently working for Kaientai Dojo
 , Japanese politician of the Democratic Party of Japan
 , former Japanese football player
 , Japanese footballer
 , retainer of the Ogigayatsu-Uesugi branch of the Uesugi, and the builder of Takiyama Castle
 , Japanese shogi player
 , former Japanese football player
 , career officer in the Imperial Japanese Navy during World War II
 , Japanese footballer
 , Japanese swimmer
 , Japanese photographer
 , the chamberlain of the Akō han in Harima Province, Japan (1679–1701), known as the leader of the forty-seven rōnin

Fictional characters
 Hisako Ōishi, a Japanese schoolteacher in the 1952 novel Twenty-Four Eyes and the 1954 film adaptation of the same name

Japanese-language surnames